The Ciuhur is a left tributary of the river Prut in northwestern Moldova. Its source is near the town Ocnița, and it flows through the villages Mihălășeni, Grinăuți-Raia, Bîrlădeni, Ruseni, Parcova, Cupcini, Stolniceni, Pociumbăuți, Pociumbeni, Horodiște and Văratic. It discharges into the Lake Stânca-Costești, which is drained by the Prut, near Costești.

References

Rivers of Moldova
Tributaries of the Prut